The Sony α33 or Sony Alpha 33 (model name SLT-A33) is a digital SLT camera announced by Sony on August 24, 2010, at the same time as the Sony Alpha 55. These two cameras are the joint first production DSLT cameras to be announced.

Lens mount

Sony Alpha SLT-a33 uses  A-mount lens bayonet.

References
http://www.dpreview.com/products/sony/slrs/sony_slta33/specifications

33
Live-preview digital cameras
Cameras introduced in 2010